Risteárd Buidhe Kirwan (1708–1779) was an Irish soldier and duellist.

Biography
Kirwan was a son of Patrick Kirwan of Cregg and Mary Martin of Dangan. Both towns are in County Galway, and his parents were members of the Tribes of Galway. He was an uncle of the scientist Richard Kirwan, and a cousin of Richard Martin MP, founder of the Society for the Prevention of Cruelty to Animals.

He travelled to France for his education. He joined Dillon's Regiment of the Irish Brigade. He became famed as a swordsman and duellist, and for his stature, which measured six feet four inches in height. Among his closest acquaintances were Lord Clare and Maurice de Saxe. He participated in the Battle of Fontenoy (1745).

His became notorious because of his duelling, and was obliged to leave France. He joined the Austrian service. He retired in 1751 and returned to Ireland. He married Maria Birmingham, a relative of Baron Athenry, and had issue. He was nicknamed Risteárd Buidhe a' chlaidhimh (swarthy Richard of the sword) and Nineteen-duel Dick.

A watch presented to him by Louis XV, set with diamonds and pearls, was in the possession of the Kirwan family as of 1949.

See also

 William Ó Ciardhubháin, family founder, fl. 1488
 Francis Kirwan, Bishop of Killala, 1589–1661
 Dominick Kirwin, Irish Confederate, fl. 1642–1653
 Annette Kirwan, first wife of Edward Carson, Baron Carson, (died 1913)

References

 Biographical Dictionary of Irishmen in France, Richard Hayes, Dublin, 1949
 http://homepages.rootsweb.ancestry.com/~jmack/kirwan.htm

18th-century Irish people
People from County Galway
Irish duellists
1708 births
1779 deaths
Irish expatriates in France
Irish expatriates in Austria-Hungary
Irish soldiers in the French Army
Irish soldiers in the Austrian Army